Hypochrosis subrufa is a geometer moth in the subfamily Ennominae first described by Max Bastelberger in 1908. The species can be found in lowland forests in Borneo and Palawan.

External links

Hypochrosini
Moths of Borneo
Moths described in 1908